Acid Motherhood is the eleventh studio album by Gong and the eighth album by the Daevid Allen version of the group, released in 2004.  The line-up on this album consists of a merger of latter-day Gong, with members of University of Errors (guitarist Josh Pollock), and Acid Mothers Temple (Kawabata Makoto and Cotton Casino). It is the only Gong studio album not to include saxophone and to include three guitarists.

Track listing 
 "Ocean of Molasses" (O. Allen, Bradbridge, Kawabata, Pollock) – 0:32 	
 "Supercotton" (O. Allen, Kawabata, Pollock, D. Allen) – 8:36 	
Gilli Smyth – vocals
 "Olde Fooles Game" (Sheehan, D. Allen) – 2:08 	
 "Zeroina" (D. Allen, Howlett) – 2:56 	
 "Brainwash Me" (Pollock, D. Allen) – 3:58 	
 "Monstah!" (Pollock) – 2:31
Greg Sheehan – percussion
 "Bible Study" (Das Ubuibi) – 0:30 	
 "Bazuki Logix" (Kawabata) – 4:15 	
 "Waving" (Pollock, D. Allen) – 4:05 	
 "Makototen" (Kawabata, Pollock, O. Allen) – 13:36 	
 "Schwitless in Molasses" (O. Allen, Pollock, Kawabata) – 4:36
Kurt Schwitters – voice

Personnel 
Gong
 Daevid Allen – guitar, vocals
 Kawabata Makoto – guitar, bouzouki
 Josh Pollock – guitar, drums
 Cotton Casino – synthesizer, voice
 Dharmawan Bradbridge – bass
 Orlando Allen – drums
Former and future Gong
 Gilli Smyth – space whisper (2)
Guest musicians
 Greg Sheehan – hang (3), percussion (6)
 Kurt Schwitters – voice (11)
Credits
 Orlando Allen – executive producer
 Zubin Henner – producer, engineer
 Toby Allen – cover design

References

External links 
 Gong - Acid Motherhood (2004) album review by François Couture, credits & releases at AllMusic
 Gong - Acid Motherhood (2004) album releases & credits at Discogs.com
 Gong - Acid Motherhood (2004) album credits & user reviews at ProgArchives.com
 Gong - Acid Motherhood (2004) album to be listened as stream at Spotify.com

2004 albums
Gong (band) albums